Svend Lomholt (18 October 1888 - 17 July 1949) was a Danish veterinarian and dermatologist.

He published a number of journals of his works, in 1924, he published a report at The University Institute for Theoretical Physics and Pathological Institute, Municipal Hospital, in Copenhagen about the metal composition in rodents and other creatures.

Family
He was married to Marie Kirstine Siegumfeldt until her death in 1920.

His daughter Kirsten Auken (1913-1968) was a Danish politician as are his grandchildren Margrete Auken and Svend Auken

External links
 Biochem. J. (1924) 18, 693-0 - Lomholt Svend - Investigations into the Circulation of Some Heavy Metals in the Organism (Mercury, Bismuth and Lead). at www.biochemj.org

.

Danish veterinarians
Danish dermatologists
Danish scientists
1888 births
1949 deaths